Nobuhle Pamela Nkabane  (born 1 August 1979) became the Deputy Minister of Mineral Resources and Energy in 2021. She was a member of the National Assembly of South Africa for the African National Congress. She first became an MP at the 2019 general election. Nkabane is a tutor at the University of South Africa.

Education
Nkabane earned a national diploma in commercial administration, business administration and management from the Durban University of Technology in 2001. She obtained a diploma in youth development, youth service/administration from the University of South Africa in 2009. In 2011, she graduated from UNISA with a bachelor's degree in humanities.

She earned a Bachelor of Administration Honours degree in Public Administration, a Master of Administration in Public Administration, and a Doctorate of Administration from the University of KwaZulu-Natal in 2019. In 2016/17 she fulfilled a compliance management programme at the University of Cape Town. In 2017, she obtained a Level 7 NQF qualification in executive development from the University of Stellenbosch Business School and was a participant of the AAE Summer School in Nancy, France. In 2020, she achieved a post-graduate diploma in labour law from the University of the Western Cape. She is currently studying for a Master of Science degree in International Business Administration through SOAS University of London.

Career
Nkabane worked as a personal assistant at the Umzimkhulu Local Municipality between March 2005 and November 2006 and as a youth coordinator at the Sisonke District Municipality from December 2006 to March 2012. She was a customer care manager from April 2012 to December 2017 and a director of water governance and customer care from January 2018 to May 2019 for the Harry Gwala District Municipality. Since February 2019, Nkabane has been employed as a tutor at UNISA.

Parliamentary career
Nkabane stood as a parliamentary candidate in the May 8, 2019 national and provincial elections for the African National Congress. She was elected to the National Assembly from the KwaZulu-Natal list and was sworn in on 22 May 2019.

On 27 June 2019, Nkabane was named to the Portfolio Committee on Human Settlements, Water and Sanitation and the Portfolio Committee on Employment and Labour. She left the Portfolio Committee on Human Settlements, Water and Sanitation on 19 July 2019. Nkabane was appointed to the Portfolio Committee on Sports, Arts and Culture on 5 September 2019. She left that committee on 8 October 2020.

On 21 June 2021, Nkabane was named to the Committee for Section 194 Enquiry. The committee will determine Public Protector Busisiwe Mkhwebane's fitness to hold office.

National executive
On 5 August 2021, president Cyril Ramaphosa appointed Nkabane as Deputy Minister of Mineral Resources and Energy. She was sworn in on 6 August 2021.

On 16 March 2022, Nkabane said that South Africa should be investing in nuclear energy, while speaking at the Nuclear Technology Imbizo under the theme "Promoting Global Partnership to Support the South African New Nuclear Build Program". She also said that it has been proven internationally that nuclear energy provides "an invaluable electricity source".

References

External links
Biography at Parliament of South Africa

Living people
1979 births
Place of birth missing (living people)
Zulu people
People from KwaZulu-Natal
Durban University of Technology alumni
University of KwaZulu-Natal alumni
University of South Africa alumni
University of the Western Cape alumni
Members of the National Assembly of South Africa
Women members of the National Assembly of South Africa
African National Congress politicians